Kingsgrove Bus Depot is a bus depot in the Sydney suburb of Kingsgrove operated by Transit Systems

History
Kingsgrove Bus Depot opened on 22 February 1948. It initially took over the operation of these routes from Burwood Bus Depot:

The depot was formerly equipped with CNG refuelling facilities. However in 2013, the facilities required upgrades due to the high number of gas buses meaning the compressors could not get up to pressure quickly and as they were getting old. There were issues with funding these upgrades, so instead the refuelling facilities were removed and all gas buses were moved to other depots.

As part of the contracting out of region 6, operation of Kingsgrove depot passed from State Transit to Transit Systems on 1 July 2018.

Fleet 
As of November 2022, it has an allocation of 164 buses. 

Since the late 2000s, its entire fleet has been made up of Scania buses. It formerly had a small fleet of 14.5m Scania L113TRBL buses to operate route 400 (now route 420), however these were all scrapped by mid 2019 due to their age. Its entire fleet is now made up of the standard Sydney bus: the 12.5 metre rigid.

It formerly had a fleet of Scania L113CRBs, which were all moved to other depots when the CNG facilities were removed. It was also expected to receive Volvo B12BLEA articulated buses to replace the 14.5m buses on route 400. They were sent to Port Botany depot when it was found that route 400 was unsuitable for articulated buses (a speed bump at Westfield Eastgardens could damage the turntable on articulated buses).

References

External links
Service NSW

Bus garages
Industrial buildings in Sydney
Transport infrastructure completed in 1948
1948 establishments in Australia